War Times: Reports From The Opposition is a 2003 album financed by, produced by, and featuring the voice of Van Jones. It had a radical anti-war theme and it was hosted by the controversial cultural icon Mumia Abu-Jamal, of whom Van Jones had been a political supporter. 
 Audio excerpts were played on the Glenn Beck program.

Notes

2003 albums